Fierté Montréal, also called Montreal Pride, is an annual LGBT pride festival in Montreal, Quebec. The event was founded in 2007 at the initiative of Montreal’s LGBTQ+ communities after the city's prior Pride festival, Divers/Cité, repositioned itself as a general arts and music festival. 

Montreal Pride is one of the largest LGBTQ+ festivals in Canada alongside Pride Toronto, and the largest LGBTQ+ gathering in the francophone world. Active year-round, Montreal Pride supports local LGBTQ+ communities and advocates on behalf of LGBTQ+ people living in countries that are hostile toward LGBTQ+ rights.

Today, Montreal Pride Festival attracts more than 3 million local and international visitors for 11 days of community, cultural, and festive activities including free shows, panels, and the parade.

Fierté Canada Pride Montreal 2017 

From August 10 to 20, 2017, the festival’s special edition Fierté Canada Pride Montreal 2017, was featured as part of the official programming of Montreal’s 375th and Canada 150 celebrations. In the lead-up to the parade, Montreal Mayor Denis Coderre offered an official apology to the LGBTQ+ community for violence and discrimination perpetrated against the community by local police forces in the 1960s to 1990s. The 2017 edition of the parade was the largest in the city's history. In an event that attracted significant media attention, Prime Minister Justin Trudeau marched that year with Irish Taoiseach Leo Varadkar (the first openly gay Irish leader) and Vradkar's partner Matthew Barrett. The grand marshals for this special Montreal Pride edition included: John Banks, Janik Bastien Charlebois, Puelo Deir, Khloé Dubé, Florence Gagnon, Mona Greenbaum, Maïtée Labrecque-Saganash, Mado Lamotte, Fleurien Leth Graveson, Stuart Milk, Martine Roy, Bill Ryan, Jack Saddleback, Mark Singh, Chrissy Taylor and Mark Tewksbury.

Montreal Pride 2018 
The 12th edition of the Montreal Pride festival ran from August 9 to 19, 2018. The parade was led by transgender women and their allies holding a sign which read “Trans women first, never again last.” The theme for the parade was the fifth color of the LGBTQ+ flag: blue. The grand marshals of the parade included Jacq Brasseur, Stonewall activist Miss Major Griffin-Gracy, U.S. Olympic athlete Gus Kenworthy, Dominique Lavergne, Julie Lemieux, Kennedy Olango, and Dany Turcotte.

Montreal Pride 2019 
The 13th edition of the Montreal Pride festival ran from August 8 to 18, 2019. The grand marshals of the festival included: LGBTQ+ militant and athlete Val Desjardins, advocate and M. Cuir Montréal 2011 Dany Godbout, author and activist Ma-Nee Chacaby, creator of the trans flag Monica Helms, actor and advocate Wilson Cruz and founder of Proud To Be Us Laos Anan Bouapha. The headliners for this edition included: Ciara, Margaret Cho, Ariane Moffatt, Steve Grand, 12 stars of RuPaul's Drag Race for the Drag Superstars show hosted by Sasha Velour with performances from Robin S and Janice Robinson. The theme for Montreal's 36th Pride Parade was the sixth color of the LGBTQ+ flag: violet.

Shortly prior to Montreal's Pride parade, LGBTQ activists supporting the 2019–20 Hong Kong protests were expelled from participating in the event for alleged security reasons. The move was criticized as giving in to threats against the pro-Hong Kong activists from pro-Chinese Communist Party groups.

COVID era
Due to the COVID-19 pandemic in Canada, the traditional Fierté Montréal festival was cancelled; in its place, organizers presented a digital program of online events over the internet. The events included a special virtual edition of the annual Drag Superstars show, featuring prerecorded video performances by all of the competing queens from the first season of Canada's Drag Race. Competitor Rita Baga, known as Jean-François Guèvremont when not on stage, is Fierté Montréal's director of programming.

In 2022, the planned parade was cancelled just a few hours before it was set to begin, with organizers blaming a lack of volunteer security staff due to COVID. Despite the cancellation of the official parade, however, over 1,000 attendees began their own impromptu march along the parade route.

WorldPride 2023 
Montreal Pride submitted an application to the InterPride committee to host WorldPride in 2023; however, its bid was not successful, with the event being awarded to Sydney, Australia.

References

External links

Festivals in Montreal
LGBT culture in Montreal
Pride parades in Canada
2007 establishments in Quebec
Recurring events established in 2007